Delores Hogan Johnson (born November 3, 1949) is an American politician from Florida. A Democrat, she served one term in the Florida House of Representatives, representing the 84th district in St. Lucie County from 2018 to 2020.

Legislative career 
Johnson was elected to the House in 2018, defeating Republican Mark Gotz by a margin of 51.4–48.6%.

In 2020, Johnson lost reelection to Republican Dana Trabulsy, who won by 53.0–47.0%.

References

Johnson, Delores Hogan
Living people
21st-century American politicians
21st-century American women politicians
Women state legislators in Florida
1949 births